Georgi Dimitrov (born 27 January 1911, date of death unknown) was a Bulgarian gymnast. He competed in eight events at the 1936 Summer Olympics.

References

1911 births
Year of death missing
Bulgarian male artistic gymnasts
Olympic gymnasts of Bulgaria
Gymnasts at the 1936 Summer Olympics
Place of birth missing